Brian Hopkins (born 15 March 1933) is an English former footballer who played for Port Vale and Burton Albion in the 1950s.

Career
Hopkins played for Keele University before joining Third Division South side Port Vale as an amateur in August 1957. He made his debut at Vale Park in a 6–1 win over Aldershot on 21 December and got his second game in a 1–0 defeat to Coventry City at Highfield Road four days later (Christmas Day). However, he never played for Norman Low's "Valiants" again in the 1957–58 season, and was transferred to Burton Albion in March 1958.

Career statistics
Source:

References

Footballers from Derby
Alumni of Keele University
English footballers
Association football wingers
Port Vale F.C. players
Burton Albion F.C. players
English Football League players
1933 births
Living people